Edgemont is a city in Fall River County, South Dakota, United States. The population was 725 at the 2020 census. The city lies on the far southern edge of the Black Hills in southwestern South Dakota.

Edgemont is a crew change point for BNSF freight trains in the Gillette, Wyoming-Alliance, Nebraska division.

History

Edgemont had its start in 1890 with the building of the Burlington Railroad through that territory.

In 2012, the White Draw Fire burned eight miles northeast of Edgemont. On July 1, 2012, an airplane fighting the fire crashed near town, killing four military personnel and injuring two.

On the morning of January 17, 2017, a BNSF Railway westbound train struck and killed two roadway workers, including the watchman/lookout. The accident occurred at milepost 477, on the Black Hills subdivision, in Edgemont.

Also featured in episode 10 of series 1 of Z Nation in the episode “Going nuclear”

Geography
Edgemont is located at  (43.299453, -103.828966).

The city lies at the intersection of US Highway 18 and South Dakota Highway 471. Its closest neighbors are Burdock and Dewey to the northwest, Hot Springs to the northeast, and Provo and Rumford to the south.

Edgemont lies just to the south of the Elk Mountains, a small range that is part of the Black Hills.

Climate

Education
Edgemont Public Schools are part of the Edgemont School District. The district has one elementary school and one high school. Students attend Edgemont High School.

Demographics

2010 census
As of the census of 2010, there were 774 people, 386 households, and 201 families living in the city. The racial makeup of the city was 92.1% White, 0.1% African American, 3.4% Native American, 0.3% from other races, and 4.1% from two or more races. Hispanic or Latino of any race were 2.1% of the population.

There were 386 households, of which 18.9% had children under the age of 18 living with them, 41.5% were married couples living together, 7.0% had a female householder with no husband present, 3.6% had a male householder with no wife present, and 47.9% were non-families. 42.2% of all households were made up of individuals, and 21.7% had someone living alone who was 65 years of age or older. The average household size was 2.01 and the average family size was 2.71.

The median age in the city was 51.3 years. 17.8% of residents were under the age of 18; 6.1% were between the ages of 18 and 24; 17.2% were from 25 to 44; 34.1% were from 45 to 64; and 24.7% were 65 years of age or older. The gender makeup of the city was 51.3% male and 48.7% female.

2000 census
As of the census of 2000, there were 867 people, 409 households, and 260 families living in the city. The population density was 864.2 people per square mile (334.8/km2). There were 516 housing units at an average density of 514.4 per square mile (199.2/km2). The racial makeup of the city was 93.19% White, 3.92% Native American, 0.46% from other races, and 2.42% from two or more races. Hispanic or Latino of any race were 1.85% of the population.

There were 409 households, out of which 21.0% had children under the age of 18 living with them, 54.3% were married couples living together, 6.1% had a female householder with no husband present, and 36.2% were non-families. 32.0% of all households were made up of individuals, and 16.9% had someone living alone who was 65 years of age or older. The average household size was 2.12 and the average family size was 2.64.

In the city, the population was spread out, with 20.0% under the age of 18, 3.6% from 18 to 24, 20.1% from 25 to 44, 31.8% from 45 to 64, and 24.6% who were 65 years of age or older. The median age was 49 years. For every 100 females, there were 103.0 males. For every 100 females age 18 and over, there were 98.3 males.

The median income for a household in the city was $24,919, and the median income for a family was $36,667. Males had a median income of $36,250 versus $16,667 for females. The per capita income for the city was $17,273. About 10.3% of families and 18.6% of the population were below the poverty line, including 20.9% of those under age 18 and 21.1% of those age 65 or over.

See also
 List of cities in South Dakota

References

External links

 Edgemont Chamber of Commerce
 Edgemont Herald Tribune - latest news
 Edgemont School District
 Edgemont City Hall

Cities in South Dakota
Cities in Fall River County, South Dakota
Black Hills